was a town located in Kaifu District, Tokushima Prefecture, Japan.

As of 2003, the town had an estimated population of 3,356 and a density of 144.91 persons per km². The total area was 23.16 km².

On March 31, 2006, Yuki, along with the town of Hiwasa (also from Kaifu District), was merged to create the town of Minami.

External links
 Minami official website (in Japanese)

Dissolved municipalities of Tokushima Prefecture
Minami, Tokushima